Khalil Balakrishna is a sitar and tanpura player who worked with Miles Davis between 1969 and 1974. Guitarist John McLaughlin, already interested in Indian music, suggested him and tabla player Bihari Sharma to Davis during the Bitches Brew sessions. He toured with Davis in 1972 and early 1973.

Discography
[dates are for album releases; later Davis compilations are not listed.]
Bitches Brew (1970)
Live-Evil (1971)
On the Corner (1972)
In Concert (1973)
Get Up with It (1974)
Big Fun (1974)
Circle in the Round (1979)

References

External links
AllMusic

Sitar players
Miles Davis